Mark Walsh (born 23 March 1986) is an Irish jockey who competes in National Hunt racing. Walsh comes from Clane, County Kildare and rode his first winner on Shrug at Punchestown in September 2002. He frequently rides for owner J. P. McManus and has achieved major wins for McManus on Jezki in the World Series Hurdle, Carlingford Lough in the Irish Gold Cup and Espoir d'Allen in the Champion Hurdle.

Cheltenham Festival winners (8) 
Champion Hurdle -(1)- Espoir d'Allen (2019)
 Stayers' Hurdle - (1) Sire Du Berlais (2023)
Ballymore Novices' Hurdle -(1)- City Island (2019)
 Albert Bartlett Novices' Hurdle -(1)- Vanillier (2021)
 Fred Winter Juvenile Novices' Handicap Hurdle - (2) Aramax (2020), Brazil (2022)
 Liberthine Mares' Chase -(1) Elimay (2022)
 Coral Cup - (1) Bleu Berry (2018)

Other major wins
 Ireland
Irish Gold Cup       -(1) Carlingford Lough (2016)
Champion Stayers Hurdle       -(2) Jezki (2015), Unowhatimeanharry (2019)
Drinmore Novice Chase       -(2) Coney Island (2016), Fakir D’oudairies (2019)
Racing Post Novice Chase       -(3) Defy Logic (2013), Le Richebourg (2018), Saint Roi (2022)
Paddy Power Dial-A-Bet Chase       -(2) Simply Ned (2017, 2018)
Neville Hotels Novice Chase       -(1) Shattered Love (2017) 
Greenmount Park Novice Chase       -(1) Gilgamboa (2014)
Arkle Novice Chase       -(1)  Le Richebourg  (2019)
Spring Juvenile Hurdle       -(1)  Sir Erec  (2019)
 Dooley Insurance Group Champion Novice Chase - (1) Capodanno (2022)

 Great Britain
Ascot Chase - (1) - Fakir D'oudairies (2022)
Liverpool Hurdle - (1) - Sire Du Berlais (2022)
Maghull Novices' Chase - (1) - Gentleman De Mee (2022)
Melling Chase - (2) - Fakir D'oudairies (2021, 2022)
Sefton Novices' Hurdle -(1)- Champ (2019)

References 

1986 births
Living people
Irish jockeys
Sportspeople from County Kildare